Qohestan District is in Darmian County, South Khorasan province, Iran. At the 2006 National Census, its population was 15,295 in 4,349 households. The following census in 2011 counted 15,486 people in 4,380 households. At the latest census in 2016, the district had 14,295 inhabitants in 4,326 households.

References 

Darmian County

Districts of South Khorasan Province

Populated places in South Khorasan Province

Populated places in Darmian County